for other places called Padornelo, see Padornelo
Padornelo is a civil parish in the municipality of Paredes de Coura, Portugal. The population in 2011 was 437, in an area of 6.66 km². It includes the settlement of Valinha.

References

Freguesias of Paredes de Coura